Corowa Shire was a local government area in the Riverina region in southern New South Wales, Australia. The area was located adjacent to the Murray River and the Riverina Highway.

The Shire included the towns of Corowa, Howlong, Balldale, Coreen and Daysdale, Rennie and Mulwala.

It was established in 1955 through a merger of the Corowa Municipality and Coreen Shire.

Amalgamation
The council was dissolved on 12 May 2016 and along with Urana Shire the area became part of the new Federation Council

Council

Composition and election method
At the time of dissolution, Corowa Shire Council was composed of nine councillors elected proportionally as a single ward. All councillors were elected for a fixed four-year term of office. The last election was due to be held on 8 September 2012. However, only nine candidates, being the below, nominated for election. There being no additional candidates, the election was uncontested.

References

1955 establishments in Australia
2016 disestablishments in Australia
Former local government areas of New South Wales